John Bartholomew Sr. (26 April 1805 – 8 April 1861) was a Scottish cartographer and engraver.

Life 
The son of George Bartholomew, engraver (1784–1871), he founded the engraving and mapmaking firm of John Bartholomew and Son Ltd. in 1826. Bartholomew also worked for George Philip & Son.

He was a master copper plate engraver and engraved some fine maps for local Edinburgh firms, such as street maps for Lizars, others for the Encyclopædia Britannica and for some educational publishers like A & C Black. He was commissioned to engrave the map of Treasure Island for Robert Louis Stevenson.

John Sr. was the ideal person to inaugurate what became one of the most admired cartographic institutions in the world. A man of high standards, as were his successors; he was an accomplished engraver, engraving becoming the foundation of the firm; lithography would follow later. He also had the vision to recognise the potential for the firm. He was a shy man, holding back from public life.

In 1832–1833 James was living at 4 East St James Street, which is now demolished.

In 1859, shortly before he died, John Senior passed the business on to his son John Bartholomew Junior (1831–1893).

He is buried with his wife, Margaret McGregor in the north-west section of Grange Cemetery. His son and his wife are buried with him.

References

External links
Bartholomew: A Scottish Family Heritage - site maintained by the family.
Times World Atlases official website including a History and Heritage section detailing landmark Times atlases

1805 births
1861 deaths
Scottish cartographers
Scottish geographers
Scientists from Edinburgh
19th-century cartographers
Scottish engravers
Burials at the Grange Cemetery
19th-century Scottish businesspeople